The Men's 10 metre air pistol SH1 event at the 2012 Summer Paralympics took place on 30 August at the Royal Artillery Barracks in Woolwich.

The event consisted of two rounds: a qualifier and a final. In the qualifier, each shooter fired 60 shots with an air pistol at 10 metres distance from the "standing" (interpreted to include seated in wheelchairs) position. Scores for each shot were in increments of 1, with a maximum score of 10.

The top 8 shooters in the qualifying round moved on to the final round. There, they fired an additional 10 shots. These shots scored in increments of .1, with a maximum score of 10.9. The total score from all 70 shots were used to determine final ranking.

Qualification round

Q – Qualified for final

Final

References

Shooting at the 2012 Summer Paralympics